Gurdyal Singh Besra  is Bardrick Professor of Microbial Physiology & Chemistry at the University of Birmingham.

Education
Besra was educated at Newcastle University where he was awarded a Bachelor of Science degree 1987 followed by a PhD for studies on the lipids of the leprosy bacillus in 1990.

Research and career
Besra's research on tuberculosis has made many ground-breaking discoveries in our understanding of Mycobacterium tuberculosis cell wall assembly. The cell wall of M. tuberculosis  is very distinctive, differing from other bacteria in containing an exceptional amount of unique lipids and sugars. In unravelling and characterising the proteins involved in cell wall biosynthesis, he aims to find good drug targets, which can then be further exploited using specialised assays, screens and structural biology, to identify new molecules for hit-to-lead programmes for tuberculosis.

Besra has been at the forefront in the discovery of M. tuberculosis  T-cell lipid antigens and the elucidation of the CD1 antigen presentation pathway. He is also exploring the immunotherapeutic potential of glycosyl ceramides and synthetic small molecules with colleagues against a wide range of tumours and infectious diseases, where it is important to fine tune the hosts immune response through the CD1 pathway.

Awards and honours
Besra was elected a Fellow of the Royal Society (FRS) in 2019 and a Fellow of the Academy of Medical Sciences (FMedSci) in 2013. He was awarded the Jeremy R. Knowles medal in 2014 by the Royal Society of Chemistry (RSC).

References

Fellows of the Royal Society
Fellows of the Academy of Medical Sciences (United Kingdom)
Living people
Year of birth missing (living people)